The Men's 50 metre breaststroke competition of the 2016 European Aquatics Championships was held on 20 and 21 May 2016.

Records
Prior to the competition, the existing world, European and championship records were as follows.

Results

Heats
The heats were held on 20 May at 11:07.

Semifinals
The semifinals were held on 20 May at 19:32.

Semifinal 1

Semifinal 2

Final
The final was on 21 May at 17:43.

References

Men's 50 metre breaststroke